This is the list of municipalities in Elazığ Province, Turkey .

References 

Geography of Elazığ Province
Elazig